Joël Vandekerckhove is a Belgian molecular biologist and professor at the University of Ghent (Ghent, Belgium). He is head of the VIB Department of Medical Protein Research, UGent.

His research department works on functional proteomics: development and applications, molecular cell biology and biochemistry of the actin cytoskeleton, cell biology and biochemistry of the actin cytoskeleton, cytokine signalling, and molecular and metabolic signalling.

Research at the department lead to the university spin off biotech company Peakadilly.

Sources
 Department of Medical Protein Research
 Proteomics and Bioinformatics Group
 Joël Vandekerckhove

Belgian molecular biologists
Flemish scientists
Year of birth missing (living people)
Living people